Sturgill is a given name or a surname.

Sturgill or Sturgills may refer to:

Sturgill Simpson (born 1978), American country music and roots rock singer-songwriter
Virgil Sturgill (born 1897), American ballad singer and dulcimer player
Sturgills, North Carolina, an unincorporated community